Baba Tchagouni (born 31 December 1990) is a Togolese goalkeeper.

Career
Tchagouni began his career with Académie Planète Foot and joined FC Martigues in July 2007. He made his professional debut on 19 January 2008 in the Championnat National against AC Arles-Avignon. After two years with FC Martigues he signed on 5 October 2009 a two-year contract with Dijon FCO.

International career
He played for the Togolese U-17 national team in South Korea the 2007 FIFA U-17 World Cup. He earned his first call up for the Togo national football team on 14 November 2009 for the World Cup Qualifying game against Gabon national football team.

References

Togolese footballers
Togo international footballers
Togolese expatriate footballers
1990 births
Living people
Sportspeople from Lomé
FC Martigues players
Dijon FCO players
Expatriate footballers in France
Association football goalkeepers
2010 Africa Cup of Nations players
2013 Africa Cup of Nations players
2017 Africa Cup of Nations players
21st-century Togolese people